Orbivestus turbinata is a plant in the family Asteraceae, native to tropical Africa.

Description
The capitula feature purple flowers. The fruits are achenes.

Distribution and habitat
Orbivestus turbinata is native to Sudan, Ethiopia, the Democratic Republic of the Congo, Uganda and Kenya.

References

Vernonieae
Flora of Sudan
Flora of Ethiopia
Flora of the Democratic Republic of the Congo
Flora of Uganda
Flora of Kenya
Plants described in 1873